The 2015–16 season was the 92nd season in Celta de Vigo’s history and the 50th in the top-tier.

Current squad

Out on loan

Competitions

Overall

Overview

La Liga

League table

Results summary

Result round by round

Matches

See also
2015–16 La Liga

References

External links
Club's official website

RC Celta de Vigo seasons
Celta de Vigo